Sven Tito Achen (born 29 July 1922 in Buenos Aires, Argentina; died 14 November 1986) was an Argentinian-Danish writer and author on heraldry, co-founder of the Scandinavian Society of Heraldry (Societas Heraldica Scandinavica) and the first editor of the Scandinavian Heraldisk Tidsskrift (Heraldry Journal) published in Denmark.

Bibliography
Heraldikkens femten glæder (The Fifteen Joys of Heraldry), 1971
Alverdens heraldik i farver (Heraldry of the World - In Colours), translated, and edited from Carl Alexander von Volborth, 1972
Danske adelsvåbener, en heraldisk nøgle (Danish Lordships Coats of Arms, a key to heraldry), 1973
Symbols Around Us, 1978
Danmarks kommunevåbener - samt Grønlands og Færøernes (Danish Municipal Heraldry, including Greenland and the Faeroe Islands), 1982
Kroppens symbolik (Symbolics of the Body), 1983
Symboler, hvad er det? (Symbols, what are they?), 1986

1922 births
1986 deaths
Argentine emigrants to Denmark
Danish heraldists
Danish male writers
Writers from Buenos Aires